Francis Brown may refer to:
Francis Brown (theologian) (1849–1916), American Semitic scholar
Francis Brown (college president) (1784–1820), president of Dartmouth College
Francis Ernest Brown (1869–1939), headmaster for Geelong Church of England Grammar School
Francis David Millet Brown (1837–1895), Irish recipient of the Victoria Cross
Francis Focer Brown (1891–1971), Midwestern American Impressionist painter, Professor and Director of the Muncie Art Museum
Francis Graham Brown (1891–1942), Anglican bishop
F. Taylor Brown (1925–2011), U.S. Navy admiral
Francis Brown (priest) (1670–1724), Canon of Windsor
Francis Shunk Brown (1858–1940), Pennsylvania lawyer and Attorney General
Francis Harold Brown (1943–2017), American geologist and geochemist

See also
Francis Browne (disambiguation)
Frances Brown (disambiguation)
Frank Brown (disambiguation)